Risky Business is a 1939 film directed by Arthur Lubin and starring George Murphy and Dorothea Kent.

Plot
Radio commentator Dan Clifford takes desperate chances to save the life of a young girl, Norma Jameson, who has been kidnapped.

Cast
George Murphy as Dan Clifford
Dorothea Kent as Mary Dexter
Eduardo Ciannelli as Philip Decarno
Leon Ames as Hinge Jackson
El Brendel as Axel
John Wray as Silas
Arthur Loft as Captain Wallace
Frances Robinson as Norma Jameson
Pierre Watkin as Abernathy
Grant Richards as Jack Norman
Charles Trowbridge as Henry Jameson
Mary Forbes as Mrs. Jameson

Production
The film was based on a story by William McGuire, Okay America, which had been filmed in 1932.

Arthur Lubin was attached to the project on 20 January 1939. George Murphy occasionally worked for Universal under one picture arrangements. Filming started January 30, 1939.

Reception
The New York Times said the film was not interesting and was "a risky entertainment." The Los Angeles Times said it had an "ingenious" story and "unusually good acting and direction."

References

External links
Risky Business at Letterbox DVD
Risky Business at IMDb
Risky Business at TCMDB
Risky Business at BFI
Review of film at Variety

1939 films
1939 crime drama films
American crime drama films
Films directed by Arthur Lubin
American black-and-white films
Universal Pictures films
1930s English-language films
1930s American films